The February strike was a general strike in the German-occupied Netherlands in 1941, during World War II. It was organised by the outlawed Communist Party of the Netherlands in defence of persecuted Dutch Jews and against the anti-Jewish measures and the activities of the Nazism in general.

The direct causes were a series of arrests and pogroms held by the Germans in the Jewish neighbourhood of Amsterdam, the Jodenbuurt. It started on 25 February 1941 and lasted for two days. On 26 February, 300,000 Amsterdam people joined the strike. The strike was harshly suppressed by the Germans after three days.

The February strike is considered to be the first public protest against the Nazis in occupied Europe and the only mass protest against the deportation of Jews to be organized by non-Jews.

Background

The Netherlands surrendered to Nazi Germany in May 1940, and the first anti-Jewish measures, the barring of Jews from the air-raid defence services, began in June 1940. They culminated in November 1940 in the removal of all Jews from public positions, including universities, which led directly to student protests in Leiden and elsewhere. Meanwhile, there was an increasing feeling of unrest by workers in Amsterdam, especially the workers at the shipyards in Amsterdam-Noord, who were threatened with forced labour in Germany.

Cause
As tensions rose, the Dutch pro-Nazi Nationaal-Socialistische Beweging and the movement's street-fighting arm, the WA (Weerbaarheidsafdeling), were involved in a series of provocations in Jewish neighbourhoods in Amsterdam. That eventually led to a series of street battles between the WA and Jewish self-defence groups and their supporters and culminated in a pitched battle on 11 February 1941 on the Waterlooplein. The WA member Hendrik Koot was badly wounded. He died of his injuries on 14 February 1941.

On 12 February 1941, German soldiers, who were assisted by Dutch police, encircled the old Jewish neighbourhood and cordoned it off from the rest of the city by putting up barbed wire, opening bridges and putting in police checkpoints. The neighbourhood was now forbidden for non-Jews.

On 19 February, the German Grüne Polizei stormed into the Koco ice-cream salon in the Van Woustraat. In the fight that ensued, several police officers were wounded. Revenge for that and other fights came in the weekend of 22–23 February, when a large-scale pogrom was undertaken by the Germans in which 425 Jewish men of age 20–35 were taken hostage and imprisoned in Kamp Schoorl and eventually sent to the Buchenwald and Mauthausen concentration camps, where most of them had died within a year. Of the 425, only two survived.

Strike

After the pogrom, on 24 February, an open-air meeting was held on the Noordermarkt to organise a strike to protest against the pogrom and the forced labour to Germany. The Communist Party of the Netherlands, which was made illegal by the Germans, printed and spread a call to strike throughout the city the next morning. The first to strike were the city's tram drivers, followed by other city services as well as companies like De Bijenkorf and schools. Eventually 300,000 people joined in the strike, which brought much of the city to a halt and caught the Germans by surprise.

The Germans immediately took measures to suppress the strike, which had grown spontaneously as other workers followed the example of the tram drivers, but it still spread to other areas, including Zaanstad and Kennemerland in the west; Bussum, Hilversum and Utrecht in the east; and in the south.

The strike did not last long. By 27 February, much of it had been suppressed by the German police. Although ultimately unsuccessful, it was significant in that it was the first and only large-scale direct action against the Nazis' treatment of Jews in Europe.

The next strikes would be student strikes in November 1941 and the large April–May strikes in 1943, which ushered in a period of armed covert resistance on a national scale.

In the rest of Nazi-occupied Europe, the Greeks in April 1942, the Danes from the summer of 1943, the Luxemburgers in August 1942, the Belgians in May 1941, the Norwegians in September 1941 and the Northern French miners in May–June 1941 also later went on strike. However, the February strike 1941 in Amsterdam was the only strike against how Jews were treated by the Germans in Nazi-occupied Europe.

Historiography

The book De Februari-staking ("The February strike") by historian  was published in 1954.

Remembrance

This statue was made by Dutch sculptor Mari Andriessen. All political parties, as well as the city public transport authorities and organizations of Holocaust survivors, participate in the remembrance. Three communist organisers were shot to death after the strike and 12 communist organizers were sent to jails in Germany, but during the Cold War, the communists were forced to remember the strike separately from other political groups. For many years after the war, Dutch officials publicly denied contributions by the communists to the strike.

See also
 Strike of the 100,000: communist-led strike with the objective to demand a wage increase although it was also an act of passive resistance to the German occupation.
 Milk Strike: Norwegian strike in September 1941 against rationing of milk.
 1942 Luxembourgish general strike, 31 August 1942 against a German directive that conscripted young Luxembourgers into the Wehrmacht.

Bibliography

 Manheim, Jack. Memoirs of the Dutch Underground 1940–1945 – Why me? (England: Amazon, 2017).

References

External links

North French miners' strike, May-June 1941
Audio collection February strike at the International Institute of Social History
Nizzan Zvi Cohen, “They’re taking our Jews!”: How Amsterdam’s workers protested the deportation of Dutch Jews, at Davar, 21 April 2020.

Conflicts in 1941
Dutch resistance
General strikes in Europe
1941 in the Netherlands
Jewish Dutch history
1941 labor disputes and strikes
Labour disputes in the Netherlands
Netherlands in World War II
Protests in the Netherlands
February 1941 events